Handies Peak is a high and prominent mountain summit of the San Juan Mountains range in the Rocky Mountains of North America.

See also

List of mountain peaks of North America
List of mountain peaks of the United States
List of mountain peaks of Colorado
List of Colorado fourteeners

References

External links

 
Grizzly Gulch Trail to Handies Peak

Fourteeners of Colorado
Mountains of Hinsdale County, Colorado
San Juan Mountains (Colorado)
North American 4000 m summits
Mountains of Colorado